Kullar may refer to:

Places

 Kullar, Koçarlı, a village in Turkey
 Kullar, Dagestan, a locality in the Republic of Dagestan, Russia
 Kullar, Yapraklı

Geographical Features
 Kullar, Assyrian and Babylonian name of the mountain range along the lower part of the Zab river
Titles:
 Kullar, commander of the sovereign slave forces in the Ottoman regions
 Kullar (Kuli), derived from Kullar, and a religious name used especially in Safawid Persia and neighboring states influenced by it
People

People with this name or its variations include:

 Balbir Singh Kullar (born 1942), Indian field hockey player and a Punjab Police officer
 Balbir Singh Kular (born 1945), Indian field hockey player and an Indian Army officer
 Bindi Kullar (born 1976), Canadian field hockey player
 Gurmit Singh Kullar (1907–1992), Indian field hockey player
 Kullar Viimne, an Estonian director, scriptwriter, editor and cinematographer
 Manjeet Kullar, Indian film and television actress

See also
 Qullar (disambiguation)

Surnames